Preah Ponlea is a Sangkat (commune) of Serei Saophoan District in Banteay Meanchey Province in north-western Cambodia.

Villages

 Chak(ឆក)
 Phum Muoy(ភូមិមួយ)
 Phum Bey(ភូមិបី)
 Phum Buon(ភូមិបួន)
 Prey Ruessei(ព្រៃឬស្សី)
 Preah Ponlea(ព្រះពន្លា)
 Kbal Spean(ក្បាលស្ពាន)

References

Communes of Banteay Meanchey province
Serei Saophoan District